Kinnor ( kīnnōr) is an ancient Israelite musical instrument in the yoke lutes family, the first one to be mentioned in the Hebrew Bible.

Its exact identification is unclear, but in the modern day it is generally translated as "harp" or "lyre", and associated with a type of lyre depicted in Israelite imagery, particularly the Bar Kokhba coins. It has been referred to as the "national instrument" of the Jewish people, and modern luthiers have created reproduction lyres of the kinnor based on this imagery.

The word has subsequently come to mean violin in Modern Hebrew.

Identification

The kinnor is generally agreed to be a stringed instrument, and thus the stringed instrument most commonly mentioned in the Old Testament. The kinnor is also the first string instrument to be mentioned in the Bible, appearing in Genesis 4:21.

Details

Construction
Josephus describes the kinnor as having 10 strings, made from a sheep's small intestine, and played with a plectrum (pick), though the Book of Samuel notes that David played the kinnor "with his hand". The International Standard Bible Encyclopedia also notes that the early church fathers agreed the kithara (kinnor) had its resonator in the lower parts of its body. Like the nevel, the kinnor likely consisted of a soundboard with two arms extending parallel to the body, with the arms crossed by a yoke from which the strings extend down to the body.

One etymology of Kinneret, the Hebrew name of the Sea of Galilee, is that it derives from kinnor, on account of the shape of the lake resembling that of the instrument. If this etymology is correct it may be relevant to the question of the shape of the instrument.

Usage

The kinnor is mentioned 42 times in the Old Testament, in relation to "divine worship... prophecy... secular festivals... and prostitution." The kinnor is sometimes mentioned in conjunction with the nevel, which is also presumed to be a lyre but larger and louder than the kinnor. The Mishna states that the minimum number of kinnor to be played in the Temple is nine, with no maximum limit.

Use of the word in Modern Hebrew
The word כינור kinór is used in Modern Hebrew to signify the modern Western violin.

See also
Nevel

References

External links
Bo Lawergren, “Distinctions among Canaanite, Philistine, and Israelite Lyres, and Their Global Lyrical Contexts,” Bulletin of the American Schools of Oriental Research, No. 309 (Feb., 1998), pp. 41–68.

Lyres
Early musical instruments
Israeli musical instruments
Ancient Hebrew musical instruments
Sacred musical instruments